The Northampton Street Railway (NSR), founded as the Northampton and Williamsburg Street Railway, was an interurban streetcar and bus system operating in Northampton, Massachusetts and its villages of Florence and Leeds, as well as surrounding communities with connections in Easthampton, and Williamsburg.

Ultimately a prolonged labor strike beginning in August 1951, led to the company ceasing all services and relinquishing its routes and franchise later that year. Following its bankruptcy, several of the railway company's former bus routes were assumed by Western Massachusetts Bus Lines. Purchased two years after the company ceased operations, today the railway's former headquarters serves as the main garage of the Northampton Department of Public Works.

Notes

References

1866 establishments in Massachusetts
1951 disestablishments in Massachusetts
Defunct Massachusetts railroads
Streetcars in Massachusetts
Bus companies of the United States
Companies based in Springfield, Massachusetts
Railway lines opened in 1866
Bus transportation in Massachusetts
Northampton, Massachusetts
Transport companies disestablished in 1951
Interurban railways in Massachusetts
Transportation companies based in Massachusetts